Donald W. "Dudey" Moore (April 5, 1910 – April 8, 1984) was an American college men's basketball coach. He was the head coach of Duquesne from 1948 to 1958 and La Salle from 1958 to 1963. He coached his teams to a 270–107 record, winning the 1955 National Invitation Tournament, five NIT semifinals appearances and making one NCAA tournament appearance. At Duquesne, Moore's team achieved a 17–5 record in the 1949 season, and in 1950, 23 wins and another bid to the NIT. The 1950s marked an age of immense success for Dukes Basketball, with Moore leading his team to six NIT bids, during which time Moore was named "United Press Coach of the Year" and achieved a school-record 21–1 season (1951–52). In 1953, Duquesne was rated as a preseason "best in the East" and possibly the nation. With a 23–2 record, they were top seed for the NIT that year. Although they lost to the College of the Holy Cross, they achieved a new record of 26 victories in a season. Top-seeded again in '54, Duquesne, following a 19–4 regular season, finally won the title of NIT Champions in 1955. Moore coached such players as Chuck Cooper, Si Green, Dick Ricketts, and Bill Raftery.

In college, Moore played for Duquesne under coach Chick Davies.  He was inducted into the Duquesne athletics Hall of Fame in 1965.

In 1952 he was named the Coach of the Year for college basketball.

He coached Team USA to a gold medal at the 1961 Maccabiah Games in Israel, with a team that included 
Larry Brown (later a 3-time American Basketball Association All Star), along with Art Heyman (later the first overall pick in the first round of the 1963 NBA draft), and Charley Rosen.

Head coaching record

NCAA

References

1910 births
1984 deaths
American men's basketball coaches
American men's basketball players
Basketball coaches from Pennsylvania
Basketball players from Pittsburgh
Duquesne Dukes men's basketball players
Duquesne Dukes men's basketball coaches
La Salle Explorers men's basketball coaches
Pittsburgh Pirates (NBL) coaches
Pittsburgh Pirates (NBL) players
Player-coaches
Sportspeople from Pittsburgh